The House of Responsibility (HRB) in Braunau am Inn is the idea of establishing an international meeting place and a place of learning in the birth house of Adolf Hitler. People from all countries, backgrounds, religions and cultures should meet in order to discuss, learn and develop projects revolving around the concept of responsibility relating to the dimensions of past, present and future. The main demography shall be young people. The idea for a House of Responsibility originates from the founder of the Gedenkdienst and chairman of the Austrian Service Abroad Dr. Andreas Maislinger.

Conceptual background 
The conceptual challenge surrounding the birthplace of Adolf Hitler roots in the fact that the place is neither a “perpetrator’s site”, such as the Obersalzberg, the Brown House or the Reichsparteitagsgelände; nor is it a “victim’s site”, such as Auschwitz, Mauthausen or Hartheim, since Adolf Hitler was merely born in that house and lived there for only two months as an infant. Nothing relating to the Holocaust was ever consciously decided or done in that house.

Nevertheless, the birthplace of Adolf Hitler is a place of symbolic meaning, a symbol of the birth of the Holocaust, for some a symbol for the birth of evil. The challenge posed is how to commemorate a place that merely is a symbol.

The House of Responsibility is about the creation of another symbol, of a counter-symbol with the opposite meaning of what the birth of Adolf Hitler signifies. The House of Responsibility intends and envisions to turn the symbol of the birth of the Holocaust into a symbol of responsibility, learning, peace and creativity while concurrently turning the city of Braunau am Inn into a city representing the same values. 

The House of Responsibility would be based on the infrastructure and community of the Austrian Service Abroad and its worldwide partner organizations.

Origins: Braunau sets a sign 

After the FPÖ (Austrian Freedom Party) took part in the government under Jörg Haider in early 2000, the "Braunauer Rundschau" (Braunau review) started to collect signatures under the slogan "Braunau setzt ein Zeichen" (Braunau sets a sign). Andreas Maislinger, an Austrian historian and founder of the Gedenkdienst and Braunau Contemporary History Days, reacted on the call and suggested setting up a House of Responsibility in the house where Adolf Hitler was born.

Past – Present – Future 

The "Braunau review" presented the idea of Andreas Maislinger on May 4, 2000:

(Translated)

Volunteers from all countries, Austrian Zivildieners and former Austrian Servants Abroad should work and live together in the house. Because of this there should take place a constant exchange of ideas. The 'House of Responsibility' should be something completely new, split into three stories, where the 'unwanted inheritance' and the refurbishment of the background of the NS should take place on the first floor. The second floor will be devoted to the present, and concrete help for people will be offered for example through the Austrian Social Service and also by human rights – and third-world projects. On the third floor ideas for a more peaceful future should be worked out.

Philosophical basis for this project is the book 'Das Prinzip Verantwortung' (The concept responsibility) written by Hans Jonas in 1979.

Realisation 
The project couldn't be realized in the following years but the idea of taking responsibility remained. In 2005 the owner of a house close to where Hitler was born offered his house for the project. In 2002 members of the Gedenkdienst remembered the Austrian Righteous Among the Nations in front of Hitler's birth house. In October 2009 mayor Gerhard Skiba argued for the first time in support of a 'House of Peace' or 'House of Responsibility' in Hitler's Birthhouse in Austria's Newspaper Kurier.

In the first half of 2014 the HRB gained increasing support by the public and by acknowledged international organizations such as the Anti-Defamation League in New York, the Auschwitz Jewish Center in Oswiecim, the European Roma Rights Center and the John Rabe and International Safety Zone Memorial Hall in Nanjing. 

On June 2 2020 the Austrian Minister of Interior announced plans for the Austrian police to move into the birthplace of Adolf Hitler.  The Austrian Service Abroad opposes this decision and lobbies against it.

Supporting individuals 
"It is not an appropriate idea to turn the birth house of Adolf Hitler into a police station. It should be a dynamic center where people of divergent views come together to meet and learn about democracy and anti-semitism. A House of Responsibility would be very important and valuable from the viewpoint of the Simon Wiesenthal Center."
Rabbi Abraham Cooper

Argentina Erika Rosenberg
Austria Mina Ahadi, Martha Bißmann, Emil Brix, Erhard Busek, Alfred Dorfer, Klaus Eberhartinger, Valie Export, Franz Fischler, Alfred Gusenbauer, Josef Hader, André Heller, Ludwig Laher, Thomas Maurer, Cornelius Obonya, Florian Scheuba, Danielle Spera, Dirk Stermann, Ferdinand Trauttmansdorff
Brazil Alberto Dines
China Pan Guang
France Michel Cullin, Beate Klarsfeld
Germany Aleida Assmann Markus Ferber, Stefan Klein
Hungary György Dalos, Paul Lendvai
Israel Ben Segenreich, Moshe Zimmermann
Japan Sven Saaler
New Zealand Chris Harris 
Poland Wladyslaw Bartoszewski
Russia Ilya Altman
South Africa Tali Nates 
Sweden Gerald Nagler
Switzerland Beat Wyss
Ukraine Borys Sabarko
United Kingdom Ladislaus Löb
United States Abraham Foxman, Branko Lustig, Jack Kliger

Supporting organizations / institutions
Poland Auschwitz Jewish Center  
USA Anti-Defamation League
Ukraine Past / Future / Art
Belgium European Roma Rights Center

See also
Hitler birthplace memorial stone
Braunau Contemporary History Days
Austrian Holocaust Memorial Service
Austrian Peace Service
Austrian Social Service
Andreas Maislinger

References

External links
 House of Responsibility
 maislinger.net

Non-profit organisations based in Austria
Historic sites in Austria
Holocaust commemoration
Braunau am Inn
Adolf Hitler